The Dave Garroway Show is an American television variety program that was broadcast on NBC from October 2, 1953, to June 25, 1954.

Vincent Terrace's Encyclopedia of Television Shows, 1925 through 2010 described the show as "A casual program of music, songs, and chatter." The 30-minute program was broadcast on Friday nights.

As the title indicated, Dave Garroway was the host. For the nine months that the program aired on Friday evenings, he was also host of the Today morning program. Other regulars on the program were Jack Haskell, Jill Corey, Cliff Norton, and Shirley Hammer, along with dancers Ken Spaulding and Diane Sinclair.

References

External links 
 

1953 American television series debuts
1954 American television series endings
1950s American variety television series
Black-and-white American television shows
NBC original programming